Don Bosco FC is a Puerto Rican soccer team based in San Juan, Puerto Rico.

History

In 2016, they competed in the inaugural Copa Luis Villarejo. Losing in the first round to Criollos de Caguas FC with an aggregate of 2–14.

On February 26, Don Bosco beat GPS Puerto Rico 2–1 to win the 2017 Don Bosco Cup preseason tournament with Luis Jordán scoring on a penalty and Alexander Cruz scoring late in the game to finish it.

Current squad

Year-by-year

Achievements

Domestic
Don Bosco Cup

Cup Champions: 2017

References 

Association football clubs established in 1952
Football clubs in Puerto Rico
1952 establishments in Puerto Rico